Noppadol Wanwang (born ) is a Thai male former weightlifter, who competed in the +108 kg category and represented Thailand at international competitions. He competed at world championships, most recently at the 1997 World Weightlifting Championships.

Major results

References

1978 births
Living people
Nopadol Wanwang
Place of birth missing (living people)
Weightlifters at the 1996 Summer Olympics
Weightlifters at the 1998 Asian Games
Nopadol Wanwang
Nopadol Wanwang
Nopadol Wanwang